Giral is a surname. Notable people with the surname include:

 José Giral (1879–1962), Spanish politician during the Second Spanish Republic
 Sergio Giral (born 1937), Black Cuban-American film writer and director
 Jean Giral (1700–1787), French architect from Montpellier

See also
 El Giral, town in the Colón province of Panama
 Stade Aimé Giral, multi-purpose stadium in Perpignan, France